Japan competed at the 1956 Winter Olympics in Cortina d'Ampezzo, Italy.  Chiharu Igaya won the nation's first ever medal and the first ever Asian champion at the Winter Olympic Games.

Medalists

Alpine skiing

Men

Cross-country skiing

Men

Nordic combined 

Events:
 normal hill ski jumping (Three jumps, best two counted and shown here.)
 15 km cross-country skiing

Ski jumping

Speed skating

Men

References
Official Olympic Reports
International Olympic Committee results database
 Olympic Winter Games 1956, full results by sports-reference.com

Nations at the 1956 Winter Olympics
1956
Winter Olympics